Klub Koszykówki Włocławek (in English: Basketball Club Włocławek), or known for sponsorship reasons as Anwil Włocławek, is a Polish professional basketball club, based in Włocławek, Poland. The team plays in the Polish Basketball League (PLK) and internationally in the FIBA Europe Cup. Their home arena is Hala Mistrzów.

The club has won the PLK championship three times – in 2003, 2018 and 2019. The club has also won four Polish Cup titles and three Polish Supercup titles.

History
In the 2017–18 season, Anwil finished first in the regular season with a 24–8 record. In the following playoffs, Anwil beat Turów Zgorzelec in the quarterfinals and defending champions Zielona Góra in the semifinals. On 4 June 2018, Włocławek won its second PLK title after defeating Stal Ostrów Wielkopolski 65–73 in Game 6 of the finals. Anwil's Kamil Łączyński, who averaged 10.8 points and 4.8 assists in the series, was named PLK Finals MVP.

In the 2018–19 season, Anwil made its debut in the Basketball Champions League. In Group A, Anwil had a 4–10 record and did not advance past the regular season. In the playoffs, it eliminated first-seeded Arka Gdynia in the semifinals, 3–2. In the finals, the team beat Polski Cukier Toruń in seven games to repeat as Polish champions. The deciding Game 7 was won 77–89 despite the game being in Toruń.

Evolution of the logo
The logo of the club features a rottweiler dog. The logo features a star in its logo for every PLK championship won.

Honours

Domestic competitions
Polish Basketball League
 Winners (3): 2003, 2018, 2019
 Runners-up (8): 1993, 1994, 1999, 2000, 2001, 2005, 2006, 2010
 3rd place (4): 1995, 2009, 2020, 2022
 Semifinals (6): 1996, 2002, 2004, 2007, 2013, 2016
Polish Basketball Cup
 Winners (4): 1995, 1996, 2007, 2020
 Runners-up (3): 2004, 2011, 2017
Polish Basketball Supercup
 Winners (3): 2007, 2017, 2019
 Runners-up (2): 2018, 2020

European competitions
Saporta Cup:
 Semifinals (1): 2002
 Quarterfinals (1): 2001
Korać Cup:
 Quarterfinals (1): 2000
European North Basketball League:
Winners (1): 2022

Season by season

Sponsorship naming
 Provide Włocławek (1991–1992)
 Nobiles Włocławek (1992–1996)
 Nobiles/Azoty Włocławek (1996–1997)
 Azoty/Nobiles Włocławek (1997)
 Anwil/Nobiles Włocławek (1997–1998)
 Nobiles/Anwil Włocławek (1998–1999)
 Anwil Włocławek (1999–present)

Home arenas
 Hala OSiR (1991–2001)
 Hala Mistrzów (2001–present)

Players

Retired numbers

Current roster

Depth chart

Notable players

Individual awards

 In the seasons 1999/2000 – 2002/2003, the best squads of Poles and foreigners were selected.

Head coaches

References

External links
 Official website

Basketball teams in Poland
Sport in Kuyavian-Pomeranian Voivodeship
Włocławek
Basketball teams established in 1991
1991 establishments in Poland